Pro Caelio is a speech given on 4 April 56 BC, by the famed Roman orator Marcus Tullius Cicero in defence of Marcus Caelius Rufus, who had once been Cicero's student but more recently was a political rival. Cicero's reasons for defending Caelius are uncertain, but various theories have been postulated.

The speech is regarded as one of the best examples of Roman oratory known and has been so regarded throughout history. It is noteworthy as a prime example of Ciceronian oratorical technique.

Caelius was charged with vis (political violence), one of the most serious crimes in Republican Rome. Caelius' prosecutors, Lucius Sempronius Atratinus, Publius Clodius (it has been suggested to be Publius Clodius Pulcher, but it was more likely a freedman or relative), and Lucius Herennius Balbus, charged him with the following crimes:
 Inciting civil disturbances at Naples;
 Assault on the Alexandrians at Puteoli;
 Damage to the property of Palla (about which we know little to nothing);
 Taking gold for the attempted murder of Dio of Alexandria, then attempted poisoning of Clodia; and
 The murder of Dio.

Caelius spoke first in his own defense and asked Marcus Licinius Crassus to defend him during the trial. Cicero's speech was the last of the defense speeches. The magistrate Gnaeus Domitius presided over the trial.

Background and trial
Marcus Caelius Rufus was born in 88 or 87 BC, at Interamnia in Picenum, where his father was categorised as a member of the eques (knight) class, a wealthy middle class placed just below the patrician upper class. From 73 to 63 BC, Caelius served a political apprenticeship under Crassus and Cicero. Throughout that apprenticeship, he became familiar with life in the Roman Forum. In 63 BC, Caelius turned his back on Cicero to support Catiline, who was running for consulship. It is unclear whether or not Caelius supported Catiline after the latter had lost the election and taken up arms, but he was not among the people prosecuted for their involvement in the conspiracy.

From 62 to 60, Caelius left Rome to serve with the governor of Africa, Quintus Pompeius Rufus. As a young man, that was a very good opportunity for Caelius to see the world and make a little money. However, Caelius still wanted to make a name for himself in Rome, and in April 59 BC, he brought prosecution against Gaius Antonius Hybrida, Cicero's colleague in the consulship of 63 BC, for extortion. Cicero disapproved of the prosecution and took up Hybrida's defense. However, Caelius won the trial and gained recognition among Roman citizens.

As a result, Caelius was able to move to the Palatine Hill and rented an apartment from Clodius. His apartment was located near Clodius's sister, Clodia, who was then 36 and widowed. Caelius and Clodia soon became lovers. In late 57 or early 56 BC, Caelius broke from the Clodii for some unknown reason. Clodius and Clodia were determined to punish Caelius for leaving them.

On February 11, 56 BC, Caelius charged Lucius Calpurnius Bestia with electoral malpractice in the elections for praetor in 57 BC. Cicero came to Bestia's defense and successfully acquitted him four times already and doing so once again against Caelius. However, Caelius would not admit defeat and made a second charge against Bestia, who was running for the praetorship once again in the elections of 56 BC. Bestia's son, Lucius Sempronius Atratinus, did not want his father's trial to take place and so he made a charge against Caelius. If Caelius was convicted, he could not proceed with his prosecution against Bestia. Atratinus charged Caelius in the violence court (quaestio de vi) to prevent any delay in the proceedings of the trial. Publius Clodius and Lucius Herennius Balbus came to Atratinus's assistance.

Charges
The charges made against Caelius were all linked to the attempt of King Ptolemy XII of Egypt to recover his throne after being deposed in 59 BC. After he had been deposed, Ptolemy fled to Rome, where he pleaded with the Senate to give him an army so that he might reclaim his throne. However, the Alexandrians were not interested in giving Ptolemy back the throne of Egypt and sent a deputation of 100 citizens, led by the philosopher Dio, to the Roman Senate to hear their case. Ptolemy reacted by bribing, intimidating and even murdering members of the deputation, which angered Roman citizens. Despite Ptolemy's efforts, Dio successfully made it to Rome and stayed in the house of Titus Coponius, a member of the Roman Senate. In 57 BC, the consul Publius Cornelius Lentulus Spinther decreed that Ptolemy should be restored to the throne of Egypt. However, an oracle was found in the Sibylline Books that forbade Ptolemy's restoration, and the Senate was forced to rescind its decree. Exhausted from his attempts to reclaim his throne, Ptolemy retired to Ephesus. In Rome, Pompey waited for the command to claim the throne of Egypt.

In 56 BC, Dio was murdered. The public directed most of their anger toward Pompey, whom they believed to be responsible for the murder. At first, Publius Asicius, who was supposedly an agent of Pompey, was prosecuted for the murder of Dio. However, after Cicero successfully defended him, Asicius was acquitted, and Caelius was prosecuted for the murder.

Trial
The actual trial took place April 3–4, 56 BC. The prosecution spoke first, and Atratinus attacked Caelius's character and morals, Clodius described the charges in detail, and Balbus spoke against Caelius's behavior and morality.

The defence speeches began with Caelius making witty jeers at Clodia. Then, Crassus defended against the actual charges, and finally, Cicero attacked Clodia. Cicero's speech took place on April 4, the second day of the trial. He made accusations that Clodia was no better than a prostitute and claimed that Caelius was a smart man to disassociate himself from her. By centering his speech on attacking Clodia, Cicero avoided setting himself against public opinion or damaging his relationship with Pompey. In the end, Caelius was acquitted of all of the charges.

Scholarly observations

Connection between water and Clodia
Christer Bruun's "Water for Roman Brothels: Cicero Cael. 34" discusses the symbolic and representational meaning of water used in Cicero's Pro Caelio, § 34. Bruun's scholarly observation provides background on the defence case of Marcus Caelius Rufus, suggesting that Caelius's scornful lover Clodia, the sister of Publius Clodius Pulcher, brought charges against him and proclaimed that he had attempted to use poison on her. Bruun also concludes that Cicero, who remained the legal defender of Caelius, ultimately used the conceptual phrase aqua inceste uterere in "referring to the commonly known possession of a water supply by some brothels in Rome, while at the same time implying that Clodia was a prostitute." The body of Bruun's Water for Roman Brothels is subdivided into multiple different subtopics; the first one devoted to Cicero's personification of Appius Claudius Caecus. Bruun argues that in § 34 of Pro Caelio, Cicero powerfully employs "the oratorical technique of "personification" or "speech in character" (prosopopeia) and for a while pretended, apparently both by gestures and by voice, to be one of Clodia's most famous ancestors, the Roman censor Appius Claudius Caecus." According to Bruun, Appius proclaims to have spurred three major civic accomplishments, and for each Cicero, attempts to point out a reason that Clodia should be ashamed of herself for immorality connected with the Appian works. Cicero recalls Appius's construction of the Via Appia and attempts to connect Clodia's immoral desecration of "this deed of her ancestor by walking on it in dubious company and for dubious purposes, indeed by "walking the street"; in effect, he proclaims her as a prostitute. Bruun finds that passage not to be sufficient and suggests instead that "it seems baffling that the use of water, should have been connected to Clodia's allegedly loose morals". Again dispelling Cicero's connection of Clodia to water and sexual immorality, Bruun proclaims that to be antithetical to Clodia's case by stating that "the evidence from the Roman world for ritual cleansing with water after sexual "pollution" is very meager and different in character". Bruun argues within his next sub-point that more compelling evidence exists on Clodia's immorality in connection with water in the late Roman Republican period, ultimately by providing an analysis on Marcus Caelius Rufus's speech on illegal water conduits. Brunn provides Frontinus' De aquaeductu Urbis Romae from AD 100 as an example of the "various illegal uses to which public water in Rome was being diverted". Bruun suggests that as a recent find by a contemporary author, Caelius actually gave a speech in 50 BC when he was a curule aedile and ultimately proclaimed "the worst misappropriation of public water in Rome", which was due "all the brothels, were enjoying an illegal supply of running water". Furthermore, Bruun concludes that although those possible arguments can explain why Cicero attempted to connect Clodia to immorality and water, he simply used that argumentation to suggest that Clodia's case against Caelius was unfounded. Bruun finally suggests that Cicero's oratorical ploy was developed for convenience and to supply a "witty invective that referred to known malpractices in Rome".

Comedy
Matthew Leigh's "The Pro Caelio and Comedy" suggests his thesis remains centred on "proposing a fresh approach" to the comedy in Pro Caelio but not in directly refuting past literary scholarship, like Katherine Geffcken's 1973 monograph, "Comedy in the Pro Caelio". According to Leigh, Geffcken identifies Cicero with "the wiles and verbal ingenuity of the comic hero" and in effect "the jury becomes complicit in his successful bid to talk his young associate Caelius out of a distinctly tricky situation". Leigh postulates that Cicero attempts to make the jury study what he claims to be the central issues in the case, as if they were watching a comedy. Leigh suggests the focus of his thesis remains not to identify the "role comedy takes in the Pro Caelio as what it might mean for our understanding of rhetorical practice to state that comedy takes such a role". Leigh further suggests that the role in his work is to answer "what, in particular, is the relationship between comic morality and the locus as a unit of rhetorical argumentation, and what is the evidence for its historical development at Rome?" Leigh's analysis suggests that the comedic influence within Cicero's defense speech remains focused on the distinction between the ill-fated young male lover (Caelius) and the assault generated at him by an immoral prostitute (Clodia Pulcher). Leigh names Pro Caelio and other contemporary legal cases with similar constructs centered on this type of prosecution as "New Comedy". According to Leigh, the jury at Caelius's prosecution would have recognised "both stock types familiar from the comic stage": both Caelius and Clodia. Leigh also provides historical and literary evidence for the comic construction of the relationship between the courtesan Clodia and her young lover Caelius by referencing Plutarch's discussion of that as erotic entertainment and its use as a rhetorical device.

Cicero's ulterior motive
In T. A. Dorey's article "Cicero, Clodia, & the ‘Pro Caelio'", Dorey argued that although Cicero stressed Clodia's involvement in the case against Caelius as an important role, she played only a secondary part. In fact, Herennius stated that the case against Caelius would not have been made without the prosecution against Bestia. Dorey claimed that the prosecution of Caelius was an attempt at delaying the second charge against Bestia, and was caused by Caelius' new attack against the family of Bestia and Atratinus.

Throughout the speech, Cicero displaced the cause of the attack on Clodia, instead of an attack on Atratinus, to build his defense of Caelius. Dorey claims that cannot be believed, however, because an orator and a historian in Ancient Rome were not the same since an orator's job was "to win his case" and a historian's was to tell "the truth". In his article, Dorey claims that the prosecution's aim was that "even if Caelius were acquitted, there was the chance of his emerging so discredited as seriously to jeopardize his prospects of success in his renewed action against Bestia". To do so, the prosecution charged him with two attempted murders. The charges would have been indisputable because Clodia had previously provided Caelius with funds before, and there was "little doubt" that Caelius had taken part in the intimidation and persecution of the Alexandrian envoys; Cicero even admitted it in his speech. Even though Cicero tried to "ridicule" Licinius and the slaves of Clodia's rendezvous at the baths to defend Caelius, there was no doubt that the event took place and that "a casket containing some substance to be administered to Clodia" was exchanged.

Dorey argued in the article that Clodia's involvement in the trial as "vindictive spite and the desire to revenge herself on Caelius for casting her off" was a part of Cicero's strategy in his defense of Caelius. By proving that Clodia was attacking Caelius out of spite, he proved Caelius's innocence. In fact, the prosecution's strategy hinged on the jury's acceptance of Clodia's evidence. Cicero's strategy then depended on his ability to disprove Clodia in three ways: by proving that the case was brought against Caelius because Clodia was being vindictive, by casting doubt on the reliability of witnesses and by discrediting Clodia completely. Therefore, Cicero unleashed a cruel attack against Clodia in his defense, but the attack had been provoked. Clodia had helped loot Cicero's house during his exile after the Catiline events, and in 60 BC, Cicero wrote a letter to Atticus in which he "[indulged] in an extremely lewd witticism at Clodia's expense".

Domus motif
Anne Leen's article "Clodia Oppugnatrix: The Domus Motif in Cicero's Pro Caelio" argued that Cicero's use of the Roman institution of the domus, or home, established the respectable reputation of Caelius and the ghastly reputation of Clodia. The domus in Latin literature "is charged with precisely gendered social, cultural, and political significance". It is mentioned within the speech at least 27 times. Clodia's house is mentioned the most and it "a problematized space in which traditional Roman expectations of domestic behavior are egregiously violated". Leen then argued that to be a strategy of Cicero in which he attacked Clodia and defended Caelius. Each time that the domus is mentioned, the actual home should be understood as well as the immediate family and extended family. The décor and visitors of the domus and the family determined the owner's reputation, power and prestige in Republican Rome. Throughout the speech, Cicero resurrected Caelius's reputation by repeatedly placing him in prestigious Roman domus such as the homes of Crassus and Cicero.

In Latin literature, the domus was the sphere of influence for women that displayed the Roman qualities of "chastity, fidelity, and wifely obedience" to the husband. Clodia's household was, by default, in the wrong because there was no male present. Throughout the speech, Cicero did not try to disprove the allegations completely that Clodia had brought against Caelius, but he aimed to disprove her through destroying her reputation with the domus imagery. When Cicero described Clodia's household, he never mentioned Caelius being at her house at the same time as her. By doing so, Cicero cast Caelius on the "positive side of Roman values" and put Clodia in an "abyss of sexual license and its metonymic counterparts, public chaos and political anarchy".

Cicero also brought the history of the Clodian family into his speech to discredit Clodia by contrasting Clodia's present behavior with the behaviour of her "great Republican lineages". Cicero also compared her to Livy's Lucretia, in which he gave the jury a discrediting comparison between Clodia and the perfect example of a Roman woman.

Men in Ancient Rome were to have a full, busy household; however, women were not supposed to have a busy household like Clodia's domus. Her household reflected "personal disrepute, sexual misconduct, and social disorder". By having her own household, she was taking what was rightly owned by men in Ancient Rome and so she blurred the lines between men and women. Cicero claimed that was a threat to the Republic as a whole. Cicero then claimed that Clodia created these charges against Caelius and attacked the reputation of Lucceius, who was living in Dio's domus. Insulting a guest would hurt the host's reputation, and Cicero did not let Clodia forget that she had done so. Through Cicero's attack of Clodia, Caelius was established as the innocent victim; his innocence essentially convicted Clodia of the murder of Dio. Leen argued that the domus had developed a conscience through the ordeal, aided and abetted Clodia through the murder of Dio and convicted her of the crime afterwards. However, Cicero did not let the jury forget that he was the best witness of Clodia's schemes by telling his story at the end of the speech. His once-great house, which housed Caelius first, no longer existed after Clodia.

Identification of Clodia as Lesbia
Among Cicero's orations, Pro Caelio is particularly celebrated for its connections to the poetry of Catullus. Popular critical consensus has long identified Clodia Metelli, who features so prominently in the speech, as Catullus's famed lover Lesbia. However, recent critics have assailed that connection with various degrees of success. In his book Catullan Questions, T. P. Wiseman argues that the identification of Lesbia as one of Clodius Pulcher's three sisters is undeniable. The 2nd-century writer Apuleius claimed that Catullus gave his lover Clodia the pseudonym Lesbia; Wiseman traces Apuleius's source for this claim to the historian Suetonius, and Suetonius'z sources to Gaius Julius Hyginus's De Vita Rebusque Illustrium Virorum. Hyginus had contact with several men associated with Catullus, who very likely knew Lesbia's true identity. They include Helvius Cinna, Pollio, Nepos, Varro and even Cicero himself. Moreover, scholars agree that the repeated word pulcher, meaning "pretty", in Catullus's poem 79 is a pun on Clodius's cognomen, Pulcher. Thus, the Lesbius in that poem is Clodius Pulcher, and Lesbia must be one of his three sisters. However, all three sisters possessed the name Clodia and so difficulties arise in proving that Catullus's lover must have been the Clodia featured in Pro Caelio. The most common evidence for that connection is the implied charge of incest usually detected in Catullus 79 in comparison to the charges of incest against Clodia in Pro Caelio. However, Wiseman characterizes Cicero's rhetoric as remaining "on the level of mocking insinuation without proof or evidence" and notes that while there were whispers of Clodius committing incest with all three of his sisters, multiple disinterested sources exist only concerning his alleged relationship with the youngest sister, Clodia Luculli. Moreover, scholars have widely assumed that the characters Caelius and Rufus who feature in several poems of Catullus should be identified with the defendant of the Pro Caelio, Caelius Rufus. That would corroborate the theory that Lesbia was Clodia. On the contrary, Wiseman proves that Caelius Rufus could not have been Catullus's Caelius because the latter was Veronese while the former was certainly not. Catullus's Rufus, however, is portrayed as a competing lover of Lesbia, and thus could be the same Caelius Rufus featured in Cicero's speech who, of course, had an affair with Clodia. Nonetheless, Wiseman concludes that while it is certain Lesbia was one of Clodius's three sisters named Clodia, it is impossible to determine which of these she was.

Accusations of Clodia's incest in Cicero and Catullus
One major potential connection between Lesbia and Clodia is the similarity between implications of incest apparent in Catullus 79 and the Cicero's charges of incest in the Pro Caelio. However, the association is weakened somewhat by James L. Butrica's argument in "Clodius the Pulcher in Catullus and Cicero". He emphasises the prominence of the word pulcher in Catullus's poem and acknowledges that it identifies the character Lesbius with Clodius Pulcher and Lesbia with Clodia. However, he goes on to argue that there are no overtones of incest in the poem. Rather, Catullus's reference to the reluctance of Clodius's associates to exchange with him a common social kiss implies connotations of fellatio. Butrica goes on to cite the 4th-century commentator Maurus Servius Honoratus, who noted that the word pulcher was sometimes used as an ironic euphemism for the word exoletus, which were Roman males raised as sex slaves from boyhood. Exoleti were characterised by effeminacy, sexual passivity, immorality and an insatiable carnal appetite. Thus, Butrica argues that the twist in Catullus 79 is the pun on Clodius's cognomen with a synonym for exoletus, and he connects that characterisation with fragments of lost Cicero speeches that attribute similar qualities to Clodius Pulcher. Butrica admits that the accusations of incest in the Pro Caelio are explicitly clear, but he characterises them as an escalation in Cicero's rhetoric against Clodius that go from merely mocking his sexual passivity to making serious charges of illegal sexual conduct with his own sister.

Cicero's use of tragedy
A. S. Hollis points out in an article written in 1998 that Cicero uses subtle references to popular tragedies that circulated around Rome at the time that Pro Caelio was given. For instance, Hollis quotes Cicero's use of equus Troianus and muliebre bellum, both of which were titles of popular tragedies contemporary with Cicero's oration. In fact, Equus Troianus was the name of the tragedy performed at the opening of Pompey's Theater just a couple years after Pro Caelio was given, as Hollis points out. There are a number of much more overt tragic metaphors that Cicero inserts into his oration. The most obvious is, of course, during the course of his vociferous assaults on Clodia, Cicero often compares her to Medea and also Clytemnestra. Finally, there are a few lines of Cicero's speech that Hollis identifies as being able to be syllabified into iambic line form and so there is even greater subtlety to Cicero's tragic references.

Cicero as patron, Cicero as father?
James M. May demonstrates Cicero's use of father/son imagery that is so prevalent in Cicero's speech, as it overlays the court room realities of Roman law, namely the patron-client relationship. From the beginning of the speech, Cicero's defense begins to present Caelius as if he were his son. May identifies and elaborates on what he views as the "boys will be boys" defense inherent to Cicero's argument. Cicero must first present Clodia as an unchaste, promiscuous woman, and he accomplishes that by his use of language associated with prostitution while he describes her. Caelius's relationship with her as the result of the former's naïveté and her seductive amoral ways. Earlier in the speech, Cicero carefully uses his advanced age and lofty reputation as an orator to defuse the usefulness of the arguments made by Atratinus, who was only 17 years old when he participated in the prosecution. Also, Cicero can defuse the connection between Caelius and Catiline by presenting the former as the rebellious son who had been seduced into false ways by corrupting influences. Finally, Cicero completes his destruction of the Caelius/Catiline connection by pronouncing that Caelius had nearly joined with Catiline, as May is quick to point out: "like father, like son!"

References

Citations

Bibliography

External links 

  Cicero, Pro Caelio, English translation at attalus.org

Orations of Cicero
Roman law
Roman Republic
56 BC
1st century BC in law